Johari Ramli (born 20 March 1949) is a Malaysian former cyclist. He competed in the individual road race at the 1968 Summer Olympics.

References

External links
 

1949 births
Living people
Malaysian male cyclists
Olympic cyclists of Malaysia
Cyclists at the 1968 Summer Olympics
People from Kedah
Cyclists at the 1970 Asian Games
Asian Games competitors for Malaysia
20th-century Malaysian people
21st-century Malaysian people